Colobura is a butterfly genus in the family Nymphalidae found from Mexico to South America.

Species
There are two recognised species:
Colobura dirce (Linnaeus, 1758) – zebra mosaic
Colobura annulata Willmot, Constantino & Hall, 2001 – new beauty

References

 
Coeini
Nymphalidae of South America
Butterfly genera
Taxa named by Gustaf Johan Billberg